Jorge Rodrigo Bava (born 2 August 1981) is a Uruguayan football manager and former player who played as a goalkeeper. He is the current manager of Liverpool Montevideo.

Career
In January 2010 Rosario Central signed the Uruguayan goalkeeper from Libertad to a two-year contract.

On January 7, 2017, signed with an MLS club Chicago Fire to a one-year contract with two one-year options. His contract was terminated by mutual consent on January 18, 2018.

Honours

Nacional

Uruguayan League (3): 2002, 2005, 2005–06

Libertad

Paraguayan League (1): 2007

References

External links
 

1981 births
Living people
Footballers from Montevideo
Uruguayan footballers
Association football goalkeepers
C.A. Progreso players
Peñarol players
Juventud de Las Piedras players
Club Nacional de Football players
C.A. Bella Vista players
Club Libertad footballers
Atlas F.C. footballers
Rosario Central footballers
Atlético Bucaramanga footballers
Chicago Fire FC players
Liverpool F.C. (Montevideo) players
Club Guaraní players
Uruguayan Primera División players
Paraguayan Primera División players
Categoría Primera A players
Liga MX players
Major League Soccer players
Uruguayan expatriate footballers
Expatriate footballers in Paraguay
Expatriate footballers in Mexico
Expatriate footballers in Argentina
Expatriate footballers in Colombia
Expatriate soccer players in the United States
Uruguayan football managers
Liverpool F.C. (Montevideo) managers